Cataclysta supercilialis is a species of Crambidae moth in the genus Cataclysta. It was described by George Hampson in 1897 and is known from Madagascar.

References

Moths described in 1897
Acentropinae
Moths of Madagascar